Lindewitt is a municipality in the district of Schleswig-Flensburg, in Schleswig-Holstein, Germany.

Geography 
Lindewitt lies in a wooded landscape between the North Sea and the Baltic in the northern part of the German state of Schleswig-Holstein. The nearest large town is Flensburg.

The municipality includes the villages of Kleinwiehe (Lille Vi), Linnau (Lindaa), Lüngerau (Lyngvrå), Riesbriek (Risbrig) and Sillerup.

References

Municipalities in Schleswig-Holstein
Schleswig-Flensburg